Shine Square is a shopping center in Linkou District, New Taipei, Taiwan, that opened on July 18, 2015. The main core stores of the mall include Adidas, The North Face and various themed restaurants.

Floor Guide

Gallery

See also
 List of tourist attractions in Taiwan
 Mitsui Outlet Park Linkou

References

External links

2015 establishments in Taiwan
Shopping malls in New Taipei
Shopping malls established in 2015